The Sheffield Philharmonic Orchestra is an amateur symphony orchestra based in Sheffield, England.  Based in the cultural heart of the City of Sheffield at the Victoria Hall, the SPO draws on players of all backgrounds from across Yorkshire & the Humber, Lincolnshire and Derbyshire.  The orchestra prides itself on its rich musical history, as well as its core ethos of providing a medium for local musicians to flourish.  The Orchestra gives no fewer than five concerts a year across Sheffield and beyond, and its regular programme of season concerts is supplemented by music weekends, foreign tours, collaboration with local choral societies and open air charity concerts.  Over the years the SPO has performed in many notable venues, such as: Sheffield City Hall, Buxton Pavilion Gardens and Birmingham Symphony Hall, where they recorded a live CD with revered acoustic and electric guitarist, Gordon Giltrap MBE.  The Orchestra has also performed at music festivals on the islands of Crete, Malta and Sardinia.

The Sheffield Philharmonic are committed to performing a broad range of symphonic repertoire and commissioning new work by local composers and arrangers.  The SPO have accompanied a number of internationally acclaimed soloists, such as: Fenella Humphreys, Benjamin Frith and Rohan da Saram.  Further to this, the SPO are committed to supporting local talent across South Yorkshire; many of its younger members have gone on to study at leading UK Conservatoires.

History 
The SPO gave its first public performance on Sunday 22 April 1945 in Sheffield City Hall under the baton of Hermann Lindars, the founder of the orchestra.  The audience included the Lord and Lady Mayoress of Sheffield and the Master and Mistress Cutler, Lord and Lady Riverdale.  At the time the orchestra was known as the 'Sheffield Amateur Symphony Orchestra' but a year or so later it was incorporated into the Philharmonic Concerts Department of the Sheffield Corporation, taking on the name by which it is known today.

Over the next forty years, the SPO gave concerts regularly at the City Hall, performing with distinguished soloists and guest conductors.  During the 1980s the orchestra played concerts in St. Johns Church (Ranmoor), Beverley Minster, St Marie’s Catholic Cathedral, The Octagon Centre and Buxton Pavilion Gardens.  Family concerts were usually given once a year in the City Hall with well-known personalities such as Johnny Morris and Anthony Hopkins.

Following a few years of decline, the orchestra began rebuilding its membership and prestige under the baton of Andrew Lucas and its fortunes were further revived when John Pearson took on the role of Musical Director.  Over time, membership continued to increase and the quality of performance improved, and it was during this period that the Orchestra played a highly successful concert in Birmingham Symphony Hall featuring the music of folk guitar virtuoso, Gordon Giltrap, followed by a commercial recording of his symphonic work, The Eye of the Wind.

Conductors
Hermann Lindars 1945 – 
Andrew Lucas
John Pearson
Ewa Strusinska
Jonathan Lo 
Jack Lovell-Huckle 2016 – 2018
George Morton 2018 – Present

References

External links 
official site
blog

Musical groups from Sheffield
English orchestras
British symphony orchestras